The Catch Up is a news programme which airs on BBC Three since 1 February 2022. It is broadcast under the BBC News format and branding. It is presented by Levi Jouavel, Kirsty Grant and Callum Tulley, helping the channel's target audience (16 to 34 year olds) make sense of the world around them whilst also highlighting optimistic stories.

Format 
Similarly to its predecessor 60 Seconds, the show is fast-paced and uses on-screen graphics to highlight key information from stories. The show does not have a set air-time, but airs between 7pm and 9pm on most weekdays. Compared to 60 Seconds, The Catch Up is three times longer and runs for about 3 minutes and doesn't air at weekends.

References

External links 
 BBC News

BBC television news shows
2022 British television series debuts